Graeffea is a genus of phasmids belonging to the family Phasmatidae.

Species:

Graeffea bojei 
Graeffea crouanii 
Graeffea doederleini 
Graeffea erythroptera 
Graeffea inconspicua 
Graeffea integra 
Graeffea leveri 
Graeffea lifuensis 
Graeffea meridionalis 
Graeffea minor 
Graeffea seychellensis

References

Phasmatidae
Phasmatodea genera